Aleksandar Todorov (Bulgarian: Александър Тодоров; born 26 May 2001) is a Bulgarian footballer who plays as a defender for Septemvri Sofia.

Career
Todorov began his career in the local Septemvri Sofia academy. In 2019 he was called up for the first team. He complete his professional debut in the first league match of the season against Ludogorets Razgrad.

International career
in August 2019 he received his first call up for Bulgaria U19 for the friendly matches against North Macedonia U19.

Career statistics

Club

References

External links
 

2001 births
Living people
Bulgarian footballers
Bulgaria youth international footballers
FC Septemvri Sofia players
First Professional Football League (Bulgaria) players
Association football midfielders